The Asian fairy-bluebird (Irena puella) is a medium-sized, arboreal passerine bird. This fairy-bluebird is found in forests across tropical southern Asia, Indochina and the Greater Sundas. Two or three eggs are laid in a small cup nest in a tree. It was described by British ornithologist John Latham in 1790. The only other member of the genus and family is the Philippine fairy-bluebird, I. cyanogastra, which replaces the Asian fairy-bluebird in most of the Philippines. Both species are considered as sacred to the Tagalog people as they are perceived as tigmamanukan omens.

The male has glossy, iridescent blue upperparts, and black underparts and flight feathers. The female and first year male are entirely dull blue-green.

The Asian fairy bluebird eats fruits, nectar and some insects. Its call is a liquid two note glue-it.

Description
The Asian fairy bluebird measures  in length. The iris is crimson and eyelids pinkish; the bill, legs and claws are black, and mouth a flesh- colour. Marked sexual dimorphism is evident. The male is a shining ultramarine-blue with lilac reflections on its upper plumage, lesser wing coverts, and under tail coverts, while the sides of its head and the whole lower plumage are deep black; greater wing-coverts, quills, and tail black, and some of the coverts tipped with blue, and the middle tail-feathers glossed with blue.

The upper plumage, the lesser wing coverts, and the lower tail coverts of the female are brownish blue, with the edges of the feathers brighter. The middle tail feathers and the outer webs of all the others, except the outer pair, like the upper plumage, and remainder of tail dark brown. primaries and secondaries dark brown. The greater wing coverts, primary coverts, and tertiaries dark brown, with a blue tinge on the outer webs. Sides of the head and whole lower plumage blue, very similar to the upper parts. The young resemble the female. The male changes into adult plumage in March, the change taking place without a moult. The feathers of the upper parts first become fringed with bright blue, then the tail coverts change, and finally the lower plumage changes. Young birds with the lower plumage mixed black and dull blue, and the upper plumage like that of the adult are frequently seen.

There are several subspecies, including I. cyanea malayensis from the Malay Peninsula, where the male differs in having the undertail coverts longer, nearly reaching to the tip of the tail.

Distribution and habitat
The Asian fairy bluebird is found in Sri Lanka and the western coast of India from Travancore up to the latitude of Shivamogga, Belgaum and Sawantwadi; Sikkim and the lower ranges of the Himalayas to Dibrugarh in Assam; the Khasi Hills; Cachar; Manipur; Bangladesh; Arrakan; Bago and Taninthayi Division in Burma; the Andaman and Nicobar Islands. In southeast Asia it occurs throughout most of Indochina (including Peninsular Malaysia), Sumatra, Borneo, Java and on smaller nearby islands. The species has been reported to be more frequent in mature rainforests and in rustic cardamom plantations under native shade trees than in coffee plantations.

The subspecies known from Palawan is now thought to be a distinct species, the Palawan fairy-bluebird (I. tweeddalii).

Behaviour and ecology
This bird is common in most of the tracts it frequents, going about in small parties or in pairs.

Breeding
It breeds from February to April, constructing a shallow cup-shaped nest, sometimes of moss and sometimes of small twigs, in a sapling or small tree. The eggs, which are generally two in number, are greenish white marked with brown, and measure about 1.14 cm by .77 cm.

Feeding
It feeds principally on fruit and is generally found on the larger forest-trees.

Gallery

See also

References

External links
 Asian fairy bluebird videos, photos & sounds on the Internet Bird Collection

Asian fairy-bluebird
Birds of India
Asian fairy-bluebird
Taxa named by John Latham (ornithologist)
Articles containing video clips